Michael (Michel) Confino (1926–2010) was a historian of 18th and 19th century Russia.

Biography
Confino was born in Sofia, Kingdom of Bulgaria. He began his academic studies at the University of Sofia. He moved to Israel in 1948 and continued his studies at the Hebrew University of Jerusalem and at École pratique des hautes études in Paris. Confino earned his PhD at the Sorbonne.

In 1959 he joined the teaching staff of the Hebrew University of Jerusalem, where he formed and headed the Russian Studies Department. In 1970 Confino joined Tel Aviv University, and in 1971 he founded the Institute of Russian and Eastern Europe studies, which he headed until 1977. Between 1980 and 1985 Confino served as a visiting professor at the universities of Stanford, Harvard, Duke, Chicago and some institutions in Europe.

Confino specialized in researching the history of Russia and the problems of Europe's agricultural comparative framework of the social structure, under different regimes, both past and present. He was a member of the Israel Academy of Sciences and Humanities. In 1993 Confino was awarded the Israel Prize in History, and in 2003 The EMET Prize for Art, Science and Culture.

One of his children is the historian Alon Confino.

Publications 

 On Intellectuals and Intellectual Traditions in Eighteenth- and Nineteenth-Century Russia (Spring, 1972)

External links
 Michael Confino, at Johns Hopkins University site.
 Michael Confino, at the "EMET Prize" site.

References 

1926 births
2010 deaths
Bulgarian Jews in Israel
Bulgarian emigrants to Israel
Israeli people of Bulgarian-Jewish descent
École pratique des hautes études alumni
EMET Prize recipients in the Humanities
Hebrew University of Jerusalem alumni
Academic staff of the Hebrew University of Jerusalem
Historians of Russia
Israel Prize in history recipients
Israeli historians
Writers from Sofia
University of Paris alumni
Israeli expatriates in France